The Episcopal Diocese of Bethlehem covers fourteen counties in Pennsylvania to the north and west of Philadelphia. The current bishop, the Rt. Rev. Kevin D. Nichols, was elected as Bishop on April 28, 2018, and consecrated on September 15, 2018. The cathedral is the Cathedral Church of the Nativity in Bethlehem. The pro-Cathedral is St. Stephen's, Wilkes-Barre. Between the 1970s and the 2020s, the diocese has been a major epicenter for clerical sexual abuse claims regarding priests, youth leaders, and organists, with multiple thousands of criminal charges against clergy and lay employees.

History

The first Anglican services in the area comprising the Diocese of Bethlehem were held in Perkiomen in 1700. Settlers of English and Welsh ancestry were visited there by Evan Evans, rector of Philadelphia's Christ Church. Two years later, this group formed the parish of St. James. The Society for the Propagation of the Gospel was formed in London in 1701, with the initial goal of funding missionary clergy in America. Until the American Revolution brought an end the Society's activities in the United States, it provided support to the few itinerant Anglican clergy in rural Pennsylvania.

In early Pennsylvania settlements, missionaries of the Church of Sweden and the Church of England had a cooperative relationship, and Anglicans often worshipped with the small Swedish congregations. As Sweden decreased support for these congregations, some were taken over by Anglican clergy. In 1753, a former Swedish church near Hopewell Furnace became St. Gabriel's Episcopal Church. St. Gabriel's later established a missionary parish in Reading, which at first met in members' homes. This parish, St. Mary's, later became Christ Church parish.

In 1785, William White convened a meeting at Christ Church in Philadelphia for the purpose of organizing the Episcopal Church in the Commonwealth of Pennsylvania. The conference included laymen as well as clergy, an arrangement which had no precedent in England. St. Mary's in Reading, St. Gabriel's in Morlatton (now Douglassville) and St. James in Perkiomen (now Collegeville) were among the fifteen parishes represented at the conference. Plans were made for the first official convention of the Diocese of Pennsylvania, and delegates were chosen to attend the first General Convention for the national Episcopal Church, held later that year at the same location. The Diocese of Pennsylvania received its first bishop in 1787 when William White was consecrated bishop at Lambeth Chapel.

In 1871, the area now comprising both Central Pennsylvania and Bethlehem became a new diocese. The original name was the Diocese of Central Pennsylvania, and the cathedral was in Reading. In 1904, the western part of the diocese was separated to form the Diocese of Harrisburg. This left the eastern part of the diocese, now based in Bethlehem, covering a territory that "the name lost much of its significance." At the 1909 diocesan convention, a resolution was passed that changed the name to Diocese of Bethlehem, which took effect May 26, 1909. In the 1970s, the name of Central Pennsylvania was re-adopted by the former Diocese of Harrisburg.

List of bishops

References

External links 
 
Journal of the Proceedings of the Annual Convention of the Protestant Episcopal Church, Diocese of Central Pennsylvania from 1871 to 1909
Journal of the Proceedings of the Annual Convention of the Protestant Episcopal Church in the Diocese of Bethlehem

1871 establishments in Pennsylvania
Anglican dioceses established in the 19th century
Christian organizations established in the 1870s
Bethlehem
 
Episcopal Church in Pennsylvania
Province 3 of the Episcopal Church (United States)
Religious organizations established in 1871